A total solar eclipse occurred on January 14, 1907. A solar eclipse occurs when the Moon passes between Earth and the Sun, thereby totally or partly obscuring the image of the Sun for a viewer on Earth. A total solar eclipse occurs when the Moon's apparent diameter is larger than the Sun's, blocking all direct sunlight, turning day into darkness. Totality occurs in a narrow path across Earth's surface, with the partial solar eclipse visible over a surrounding region thousands of kilometres wide. Totality was visible from Russian Empire (the parts now belonging to Russia, Kazakhstan, Uzbekistan, Tajikistan and Kyrgyzstan) and China (now northwestern China, Mongolia and northern part of northeastern China).

Observations

Observations of the solar eclipse were made from the Tian Shan Mountains.

Related eclipses

Solar eclipses 1906–1909

Saros 120

See also
Sergey Prokudin-Gorsky

Notes

References

Photo of observations solar eclipse of January 14, 1907
Solar eclipse of January 14, 1907 in Russia
Solar eclipse of January 14, 1907

1907 01 14
1907 in science
1907 01 14
January 1907 events